Liza Part-1  is a studio album by singers Sania Sultana Liza and Tausif Ahmed, released in 2012.

Track listing

References

2012 albums
Bengali-language albums